The Men's long jump event  at the 2007 European Athletics Indoor Championships was held on March 3–4.

Medalists

Results

Qualification
Qualifying perf. 8.00 (Q) or 8 best performers (q) advanced to the Final.

Final

References
Results

Long jump at the European Athletics Indoor Championships
Long